Hondo Independent School District is a public school district based in Hondo, Texas in the United States.  Located in Medina County, a small portion of the district extends into Frio County.   The Hondo School District was organized in 1883 and became an independent district in 1904.

In 2009, the school district was rated "academically acceptable" by the Texas Education Agency.

Schools
Hondo High School (Grades 9-12)
McDowell Middle School (Grades 6-8)
Newell E. Woolls Intermediate School (Grades 3-5)
Meyer Elementary School (Grades PK-2)

References

External links
 

School districts in Medina County, Texas
School districts in Frio County, Texas
School districts established in 1904